Hertfordshire (  or  ; often abbreviated Herts) is one of the home counties in southern England. It borders Bedfordshire and Cambridgeshire to the north, Essex to the east, Greater London to the south, and Buckinghamshire to the west. For government statistical purposes, it forms part of the East of England region.

It derives its name – via the name of the county town of Hertford – from a hart (stag) and a ford, as represented on the county's coat of arms and on the flag. Hertfordshire County Council is based in Hertford, once the main market town and the current county town. The largest settlement is Watford.

Since 1903 Letchworth has served as the prototype garden city; Stevenage became the first town to expand under post-war Britain's New Towns Act of 1946.

In 2013 Hertfordshire had a population of about 1,140,700, with Hemel Hempstead, Stevenage, Watford and St Albans (the county's only city) each having between 50,000 and 100,000 residents. Welwyn Garden City, Hoddesdon and Cheshunt are close behind with around 47,000 residents.

The county centres on the headwaters and upper valleys of the rivers Lea and the Colne; both flow south, and each is accompanied by a canal. Hertfordshire's undeveloped land is mainly agricultural, with much of it protected by green-belt policies. Services have become the largest sector of the county's economy. Hertfordshire is well served with motorways and railways for access to London, the Midlands and the North.

See the List of places in Hertfordshire and also List of settlements in Hertfordshire by population articles for extensive lists of local places and districts.

History 

The county's landmarks span many centuries, ranging from the Six Hills in Stevenage built by local inhabitants during the Roman period, to Leavesden Film Studios. The volume of intact medieval and Tudor buildings surpasses London, in places in well-preserved conservation areas, especially in St Albans, which includes remains of the Roman town of Verulamium.

In 913, Hertfordshire was the area assigned to a fortress constructed at Hertford under the rule of Edward the Elder. Hertford is derived from the Anglo-Saxon heort ford, meaning deer crossing (of a watercourse). The name Hertfordshire is first recorded in the Anglo-Saxon Chronicle in 1011. Deer feature in many county emblems. Many of the names of the current settlements date back to the Anglo-Saxon period, with many featuring standard placename suffixes attributed to the Anglo-Saxons: "ford", "ton", "den", "bourn", "ley", "stead", "ing", "lett", "wood", and "worth", are represented in this county by Hertford, Royston, Harpenden, Redbourn, Cuffley, Wheathampstead, Tring, Radlett, Borehamwood and Rickmansworth.

There is evidence of human life in Hertfordshire from the Mesolithic period. It was first farmed during the Neolithic period and permanent habitation appeared at the beginning of the Bronze Age. This was followed by tribes settling in the area during the Iron Age.

Following the Roman conquest of Britain in AD 43, the Catuvellauni tribe quickly submitted and adapted to the Roman life; resulting in the development of several new towns, including Verulamium (St Albans) where in c. 293 the first recorded British martyrdom is traditionally believed to have taken place. Saint Alban, a Romano-British soldier, took the place of a Christian priest and was beheaded on Holywell Hill. His martyr's cross of a yellow saltire on a blue field is reflected in the flag and coat of arms of Hertfordshire as the yellow field to the stag or Hart representing the county. He is the Patron Saint of Hertfordshire.

With the departure of the Roman Legions in the early 5th century, the now-unprotected territory was invaded and colonised by the Anglo-Saxons. By the 6th century, the majority of the modern county was part of the East Saxon kingdom. This relatively short-lived kingdom collapsed in the 9th century, ceding the territory of Hertfordshire to the control of the West Anglians of Mercia. The region finally became an English shire in the 10th century, on the merger of the West Saxon and Mercian kingdoms.

In the midst of the Norse invasions, Hertfordshire was on the front lines of much of the fighting. King Edward the Elder, in his reconquest of Norse-held lands in what was to become England, established a "burh" or fort in Hertford, which was to curb Norse activities in the area. His father, King Alfred the Great, established the River Lea as a boundary between his kingdom and that of the Norse lord Guthrum, with the north and eastern parts of the county being within the Danelaw. There is little evidence however of Norse placenames within this region, and many of the Anglo-Saxon features remained intact to this day. The county however suffered from renewed Norse raids in the late 10th to early 11th centuries, as armies led by Danish kings Swein Forkbeard and Cnut the Great harried the country as part of their attempts to undermine and overthrow English king Athelred the Unready.

A century later, William of Normandy received the surrender of the surviving senior English Lords and Clergy at Berkhamsted, resulting in a new Anglicised title of William the Conqueror, before entering London unopposed and being crowned at Westminster. Hertfordshire was used for some of the new Norman castles at Bishop's Stortford, and at King's Langley, a staging post between London and the royal residence of Berkhamsted.

The Domesday Book recorded the county as having nine hundreds. Tring and Danais became oneDacorumfrom Danis Corum or Danish rule harking back to a Viking not Saxon past. The other seven were Braughing, Stevenage, Cashio, Buntingford, Hertford, Hitchin and Odsey.

In the later Plantagenet period, St. Albans Abbey was an initial drafting place of what was to become the Magna Carta. And in the later Wars of the Roses, St. Albans was the scene of two major battles between the Lancastrians and the Yorkists.

In Tudor times, Hatfield House was often frequented by Queen Elizabeth I. Stuart King James I used the locale for hunting and facilitated the construction of a waterway, the New River, supplying drinking water to London.

As London grew, Hertfordshire became conveniently close to the English capital; much of the area was owned by the nobility and aristocracy, this patronage helped to boost the local economy. However, the greatest boost to Hertfordshire came during the Industrial Revolution, after which the population rose dramatically. In 1903, Letchworth became the world's first garden city and Stevenage became the first town to redevelop under the New Towns Act 1946.

The first shooting-down of a zeppelin over Great Britain during WW1 happened in Cuffley.

From the 1920s until the late 1980s, the town of Borehamwood was home to one of the major British film studio complexes, including the MGM-British Studios. Many well-known films were made here including the first three Star Wars movies (IV, V, & VI). The studios generally used the name of Elstree. American director Stanley Kubrick not only used to shoot in those studios but also lived in the area until his death. Big Brother UK and Who Wants to Be a Millionaire? have been filmed there. EastEnders is filmed at Elstree. Hertfordshire has seen development at Warner Bros. Studios, Leavesden; the Harry Potter series was filmed here and the 1995 James Bond film GoldenEye.

On 17 October 2000, the Hatfield rail crash killed four people with over 70 injured. The crash exposed the shortcomings of Railtrack, which consequently saw speed restrictions and major track replacement. On 10 May 2002, the fourth of the Potters Bar rail accidents occurred killing seven people; the train was at high speed when it derailed and flipped into the air when one of the carriages slid along the platform where it came to rest.

In early December 2005, the 2005 Hemel Hempstead fuel depot explosions occurred at the Hertfordshire Oil Storage Terminal.

Geography 
Hertfordshire is the county immediately north of London and is part of the East of England region, a mainly statistical unit. To the east is Essex, to the west is Buckinghamshire and to the north are Bedfordshire and Cambridgeshire. A significant minority of the population across all districts commute to Central London.

The county's boundaries were roughly fixed by the Counties (Detached Parts) Act 1844 which eliminated exclaves; amended when, in 1965 under the London Government Act 1963, East Barnet Urban District and Barnet Urban District were abolished, their area was transferred to form part of the present-day London Borough of Barnet and the Potters Bar Urban District of Middlesex was transferred to Hertfordshire.

At the 2011 census, among the county's ten districts, East Hertfordshire had the lowest population density (290 people per km2) and Watford the highest (4210 per km2). Compared with neighbouring Bedfordshire and Buckinghamshire, Hertfordshire lacks large towns or cities on the scale of Luton or Milton Keynes, whose populations exceed 200,000, but its overall population (approximately 1 million) is greater than those of the two aforementioned counties.

The River Lea near Harpenden runs through Wheathampstead, Welwyn Garden City, Hertford, Ware, and Broxbourne before reaching Cheshunt and ultimately the River Thames. The far west of the county is the most hilly, with the Chiltern Hills surrounding Tring, Berkhamsted and the Ashridge estate. This Area of Outstanding Natural Beauty runs from near Hitchin in the north to Berkshire and Oxfordshire.

Many of the county's major settlements are in the central, northern and southern areas, such as Watford, Hemel Hempstead, Kings Langley, Rickmansworth, St. Albans, Harpenden, Radlett, Borehamwood, Potters Bar, Stevenage, Hatfield, Welwyn and Welwyn Garden City, Hitchin, Letchworth and Baldock. These are all small to medium-sized locations, featuring a mix of post-WWII new towns and older/more historical locales. The City of St. Albans is an example of a historical settlement, as its cathedral and abbey date to the Norman period, and there are ruins from the Roman settlement of Verulamium nearby the current city centre. Stevenage is a mix of post-WWII new town planning amidst its prior incarnation as a smaller town. The Old Town in Stevenage represents this historic core and has many shops and buildings reflecting its pre-WWII heritage. Hitchin also has a historic centre, with many Tudor and Stuart era buildings interspersed amongst more contemporary structures.

Hertfordshire's eastern regions are predominantly rural and arable, intermixed with villages and small to medium-sized towns. Royston, Buntingford and Bishop's Stortford, along with Ware and the county town of Hertford are major settlements in this regard. The physical geography of eastern Hertfordshire is less elevated than the far west, but with lower rising hills and prominent rivers such as the Stort. This river rises in Essex and terminates via a confluence with the Lea near to Ware. 
Apart from the Lea and Stort, the River Colne is the major watercourse in the county's west. This runs near Watford and Radlett, and has a complex system/drainage area running south into both Greater London and Buckinghamshire.

An unofficial status, the purple star-shaped flower with yellow stamens, the Pasqueflower is among endemic county flowers.

Geology 

The rocks of Hertfordshire belong to the great shallow syncline known as the London Basin. The beds dip in a south-easterly direction towards the syncline's lowest point roughly under the River Thames. The most important formations are the Cretaceous Chalk, exposed as the high ground in the north and west of the county, forming the Chiltern Hills and the younger Palaeocene, Reading Beds and Eocene, London Clay which occupy the remaining southern part. The eastern half of the county was covered by glaciers during the Ice Age and has a superficial layer of glacial boulder clays.

Natural resources and environment 

Much of the west – and much more in the east – have richly diverse countryside. These range from beech woods of the Chilterns, clayland buffer zone countryside of Braughing and the Hadhams across to ancient hornbeam coppices west of the upper Lea valley. The county has sweeping panoramas of chalklands near Royston, Baldock, Hexton and Tring.

Large parts of the county are used for agriculture.

Some quarrying of sand and gravel occurs around St Albans. In the past, clay has supplied local brick-making and still does in Bovingdon, just south-west of Hemel Hempstead. The chalk that is the bedrock of much of the county provides an aquifer that feeds streams and is also exploited to provide water supplies for much of the county and beyond. Chalk has also been used as a building material and, once fired, the resultant lime was spread on agricultural land to improve fertility. The mining of chalk since the early 18th century has left unrecorded underground galleries that occasionally collapse unexpectedly and endanger buildings.

Fresh water is supplied to London from Ware, using the New River built by Hugh Myddleton and opened in 1613. Local rivers, although small, supported developing industries such as paper production at Nash Mills.

Hertfordshire affords habitat for a variety of flora and fauna. A bird once common in the shire is the Hooded Crow, the old name of which is the eponymous name of the regional newspaper, the Royston Crow published in Royston. A product, now largely defunct, was watercress, based in Hemel Hempstead and Berkhamsted supported by reliable, clean chalk rivers.

Urban areas

Economy 

This is a table of trends of regional gross value added of Hertfordshire at current basic prices with figures in millions of British Pounds Sterling.

Hertfordshire has the main operational and/or headquarters UK site of some very large employers. Clockwise from north:

In Stevenage (a subsidiary of: BAE Systems, Airbus and Finmeccanica) MBDA, develops missiles. In the same town, Airbus (Defence & Space Division) produces satellites.

Hatfield was where de Havilland developed the first commercial jet liner, the Comet. Now the site is a business park and new campus for the University of Hertfordshire. This major employment site notably hosts EE, Computacenter and Ocado groceries and other goods e-commerce.

Welwyn Garden City hosts Tesco's UK base, hosts the UK Cereal Partners factory and in pharmaceuticals it hosts Roche UK's headquarters (subsidiary of the Swiss Hoffman-La Roche). GlaxoSmithKline has plants in Ware and Stevenage.

Hemel Hempstead has large premises of Dixons Carphone.

The National Pharmacy Association (NPA), the trade association for UK pharmacies, is based in St Albans.

Kings Langley has the plant-office of Pure, making DAB digital radios.

Watford hosts national companies such as J D Wetherspoon, Camelot Group, Bathstore, and Caversham Finance (BrightHouse). It is also the UK base of multi-nationals Hilton Worldwide, TotalEnergies, TK Maxx, Costco, JJ Kavanagh and Sons, Vinci and Beko. The 2006 World Golf Championship and the 2013 Bilderberg Conference, took place at The Grove hotel. Warner Bros. owns and runs its main UK base since the 2000s, Warner Studios, in Leavesden, Watford.

Rickmansworth hosts Skanska.

Television
Local news is provided by BBC London & ITV London, however northern parts of the county receive BBC East & ITV Anglia from Cambridge.

Sport 
In 2012, the canoe and kayak slalom events of the 2012 Summer Olympics took place in Waltham Cross, Broxbourne.

Football 

As of the 2021–22 season, there are four professional football teams in Hertfordshire: Watford F.C., Stevenage F.C.,  Arsenal W.F.C. and Boreham Wood F.C.

Since 1922, Watford play their home games at Vicarage Road. The club joined the Football League in 1920 as a founding member of the Third Division and first played in the First Division of English football in 1982, finishing as runners-up to champions Liverpool. Watford was promoted to the Premier League at the end of the 2020–2021 season. After spending one season in the Premier League, they were relegated to the Championship again for the 2022-2023 season.

Stevenage F.C. was formed in 1976 as Stevenage Borough and have played at Broadhall Way since 1980. Stevenage was the first club to win a competitive match at the new Wembley Stadium, beating Kidderminster Harriers 3–2 in the 2007 FA Trophy Final. The club currently play in the EFL League Two and have been managed by former player Alex Revell since February 2020.

Arsenal F.C., whilst based at the Emirates Stadium in the London Borough of Islington, has long held a training ground in the county. Until 1999, it held the London Colney University of London facility, until it built a new purpose-built compound adjacent to it. Watford FC currently utilises the old Arsenal training area as its training facility.

Arsenal W.F.C. play at Meadow Park in Borehamwood. The club was formed in 1987 and have played in the FA Women's Super League since its inaugural season in 2011.

Hertfordshire has many semi-professional and amateur clubs. The highest placed are Hemel Hempstead Town and St Albans City, who play one division lower in the National League South.

Rugby

Rugby league 
Hemel Stags are a rugby league team based in Hemel Hempstead. Hemel Stags have played at Pennine Way Stadium since the club's founding in 1981. Until 2018, the club played in league 1, the third tier of the British rugby league system, and now compete in the Conference League South.

Rugby union 
The Hertfordshire Rugby Football Union is the governing body for rugby union in Hertfordshire and is responsible for any interested parties involved in rugby.

Tring Rugby play matches at Cow Lane, Tring. The first XV currently play in the Regional 1 South East, League. A level 5 league.

Landmarks 

Below is a list of notable visitor attractions in Hertfordshire:
 Aldenham Country Park
 Ashridge – the estate surrounding the neo-Gothic house by James Wyatt (not open to the public) is National Trust land.
 Bridgewater Monument, built in 1832 in memory of Francis Egerton, 3rd Duke of Bridgewater.  tall and open to the public to ascend to the top
 Berkhamsted Castle
 Cedars Park, Broxbourne – historic park once the site of James I's favourite residence, Theobalds Palace. Maintained by Broxbourne Services and the Friends of Cedars Park.
 de Havilland Aircraft Heritage Centre, between London Colney and South Mimms
 Frogmore Paper Mill, Apsley
 Hatfield
 Hatfield House – Jacobean house, gardens and park
 Mill Green Watermill in Hatfield
 Henry Moore Foundation, Much Hadham – sculpture park on the work of Henry Moore
 Knebworth House,  of country park, venue of many rock and pop festivals
 Leavesden Film Studios, home of the Warner Bros. Making of Harry Potter studio tour
 Letchworth Garden City – the world's first Garden City. Site of the first planned Green Belt, the UK's first roundabout, and a number of experiments in early town planning and house and factory design
 Spirella Building
 Magic Roundabout (Hemel Hempstead) – a complex road junction
 Royston Cave – in Royston town centre
 Rye House Gatehouse in Hoddesdon (part of the Rye House Plot to assassinate King Charles II)
 St Albans
 Beech Bottom Dyke – large-scale Iron Age defensive or boundary ditch
 Sopwell Nunnery
 St Albans Cathedral
 Verulamium – Roman town remains, including museum of Roman life and the remains of a Roman amphitheatre
 Scott's Grotto, Ware
 Shaw's Corner, Ayot St Lawrence – home of George Bernard Shaw
 Stevenage – the first UK New Town
 Six Hills Roman barrows site
 Therfield Heath – a local nature reserve in the north of the county
 University of Hertfordshire – a public research university based in Hatfield
 Welwyn Roman Baths
 Welwyn Viaduct to the north of Welwyn Garden City
 Walter Rothschild Zoological Museum, Tring – a museum-annotated collection of dead mammals, birds, reptiles and insects
 Watford Museum, fine art and local artefacts

Main footpaths 
The Ridgeway
Icknield Way
Grand Union Canal Walk
Harcamlow Way
Hertfordshire Way
Hertfordshire Chain Walk

Transport 

Hertfordshire is a home county with many towns forming part of the London commuter belt and has some of the principal roads in England including the A1, A1(M), A41, A414, M1, M11, and the M25.

Four principal national railway lines pass through the county:
Avanti West Coast operates high speed intercity services via  to the Midlands, North Wales, the North West England and Scotland. West Midlands Trains provides local commuter and regional services.
Local commuter and regional services are provided by Govia Thameslink Railway. London North Eastern Railway runs high speed intercity services via  to the east coast of Northern England and Scotland
 the Midland Main Line which forms part of the Thameslink route between Bedford and Brighton via Central London with services are provided by Govia Thameslink Railway. East Midlands Railway provide intercity services along the line from London St Pancras to the East Midlands and Yorkshire
 the West Anglia Main Line from London Liverpool Street. Local commuter and regional services are provided by Greater Anglia mainly in the east of the county

A number of other local rail routes also cross Hertfordshire:
 the London to Aylesbury Line from London Marylebone runs via Rickmansworth and Chorleywood
 the Abbey Line, a local line from Watford to 
 the Cambridge Line, a branch of the East Coast line which runs via Royston and Letchworth to 

Three commuter lines operated by Transport for London enter the county:
 the Lea Valley Lines, a suburban metro line from Liverpool Street to Cheshunt via Seven Sisters
 the Watford DC Line, a suburban metro line from Euston to Watford Junction
 five stations on the London Underground Metropolitan line
The distance travelled by buses in Hertfordshire has reduced by 56.5% since 2017.

Stansted Airport and Luton Airport are both within  of the county's borders. The commercial airfield at Elstree is for light aircraft.

The Grand Union Canal passes through Rickmansworth, Watford, Hemel Hempstead, Berkhamsted and Tring.

Education 

Hertfordshire has 26 independent schools and 73 state secondary schools.
The state secondary schools are entirely comprehensive, although 7 schools in the south and southwest of the county are partially selective (see Education in Watford).
All state schools have sixth forms, and there are no sixth form colleges.
The tertiary colleges, each with multiple campuses, are Hertford Regional College, North Hertfordshire College, Oaklands College and West Herts College.
The University of Hertfordshire is a modern university based largely in Hatfield. It has more than 23,000 students.

Literature 
Hertfordshire is the location of Jack Worthing's country house in Oscar Wilde's play The Importance of Being Earnest.

Jane Austen's novel Pride and Prejudice is primarily set in Hertfordshire.

The location of Mr Jarndyce's Bleak House in Charles Dickens's Bleak House is near St Albans.

The eponymous residence in E. M. Forster's novel Howards End was based on Rooks Nest House just outside Stevenage.

George Orwell based Animal Farm on Wallington, Hertfordshire, where he lived between 1936 and 1940. Manor Farm and The Great Barn both feature in the novel.

See also 

 Lord Lieutenant of Hertfordshire
 High Sheriff of Hertfordshire
 Custos Rotulorum of Hertfordshire – Keeper of the Rolls
 Hertfordshire (UK Parliament constituency) – Historical list of MPs for Hertfordshire constituency
 List of Jewish communities in Hertfordshire
 Hertfordshire GAA
 The Hundred Parishes

Notes

References

External links 
 
 Hertfordshire County Council website

 
Non-metropolitan counties
Home counties
Counties of England established in antiquity